Cecilia Moens is a Canadian developmental biologist. Moens is part of the faculty at the Fred Hutchinson Cancer Research Center in Seattle, Washington, where she researches the vertebrate brain using zebrafish as a model organism.

Early life 
Moens was born and raised in Toronto, Canada. From a young age, Moens worked in the laboratory of her father, Peter Moens, a biology professor at York University; she would prepare agar plates and solutions and later performed electron microscopy. She decided to study developmental biology after she saw a time-lapse film of a chick embryo's development, set to the Egmont Overture, during her high school biology class.

Education and career 
Moens studied at York University, where she initially worked in her father's laboratory and later studied environmental carcinogens in the laboratory of Barry Glickman. After she completed her Bachelor of Science in 1987, she spent a year at Harvard University in the U.S. before beginning a PhD in molecular and medical genetics at the University of Toronto. Her research, supervised by Janet Rossant, concerned the development of mouses; she earned her PhD in 1993.

In 1998, she joined the faculty at the Fred Hutchinson Cancer Research Center in Seattle, Washington, within their Basic Sciences Division. She runs a laboratory that studies the development of the vertebrate brain, using the zebrafish as a model organism. She is also an affiliate faculty member in the University of Washington Department of Biology.

Awards and honors 
 Human Frontier Science Program Long-Term Fellowship (1994-1996)
 U.S. Presidential Early Career Award for Scientists and Engineers (2000)
 Howard Hughes Medical Institute Investigator (2000-2012)

Selected publications

References

External links 
 Moens Lab website

Living people
Year of birth missing (living people)
Developmental biologists
Canadian women neuroscientists
Canadian neuroscientists
Canadian women biologists
York University alumni
University of Toronto alumni
University of Oregon people
21st-century Canadian women
Scientists from Toronto
University of Washington faculty
Fred Hutchinson Cancer Research Center people